Kingdom of Sorrow is the self-titled debut album by Kingdom of Sorrow, a group featuring Jamey Jasta of Hatebreed and Kirk Windstein of Crowbar and Down. The album was released by Relapse Records.

Track listing 
All songs written and composed by Jamey Jasta and Kirk Windstein.

Personnel 
Kingdom of Sorrow
Jamey Jasta - vocals
Kirk Windstein - guitar, vocals

Additional studio musicians
Derek Kerswill - drums
Steve Gibb - guitar
Zeuss - guitar

Production
Produced by Zeuss and Jamey Jasta
Engineered and mixed by Zeuss
Mastered by Alan Douches

2008 debut albums
Kingdom of Sorrow albums
Relapse Records albums
Albums produced by Chris "Zeuss" Harris